Lewis Williams may refer to:
Lewis Williams (politician) (1782–1842), American politician
Lewis Williams (boxer), English boxer
Lewy Williams (Lewis Williams, born 2002), Welsh darts player
Lewis Williams (rugby union)  (born 1987), Welsh rugby union player
Lewis B. Williams Jr. (1833–1863), Confederate officer during the American Civil War

See also
Lew Williams (born 1934), American singer
Louis Williams (disambiguation)
David Lewis-Williams (born 1934), South African scholar